Suenaga (written: 末永) is a Japanese surname. Notable people with the surname include:

, Japanese actress
, Japanese drifting driver
, Japanese swimmer

Suenaga (written: 季長) is also a masculine Japanese given name. Notable people with the name include:

, Japanese samurai

Japanese-language surnames
Japanese masculine given names